Postnikov is a Russian masculine surname, its feminine counterpart is Postnikova. It may refer to

Aleksandr  Postnikov (born 1957), Russian military officer
Alexey Georgiyevich Postnikov (1921–1995), Russian mathematician
Alexey Vladimirovich Postnikov (born 1939), Russian historian
Filipp Postnikov (born 1989), Russian football midfielder
Golnur Postnikova (born 1964), Russian alpine skier
Mikhail Postnikov (1927–2004), Russian mathematician
Postnikov square
Postnikov system
Pyotr Postnikov (1666–1703), Russian diplomat
Stanislav Postnikov (1928–2012), Soviet military commander
Vadim Postnikov, Russian rugby player
Valery Postnikov (1945–2016), Russian ice hockey player and coach
Viktor Postnikov (born 1992), Russian ice hockey defenceman
Viktoria Postnikova (born 1944), Russian pianist
Yevgeny  Postnikov (born 1986), Russian football player

Russian-language surnames